Unchain My Heart is the eleventh studio album by Joe Cocker, released in 1987.

Miller Lite used Joe Cocker's recording of "Unchain My Heart" for their Dalmatian campaign as the dog jumps from the Budweiser Clydesdale horse-drawn carriage to the Miller Lite truck.

Track listing
 "Unchain My Heart" (Bobby Sharp, Teddy Powell) – 5:02
 "Two Wrongs" (Eddie Schwartz, David Bendeth) – 4:02
 "I Stand in Wonder" (Schwartz, David Tyson) – 4:21
 "The River's Rising" (Michael Lunn) – 4:05
 "Isolation" (John Lennon) – 3:51
 "All Our Tomorrows" (Schwartz, Tyson) – 4:21
 "A Woman Loves a Man" (Dan Hartman, Charlie Midnight) – 4:14
 "Trust in Me" (Francesca Beghe, Marc Swersky, Midnight) – 4:12
 "The One" (Tom Kimmel, Jay Joyce) – 4:35
 "Satisfied" (Hartman, Midnight) – 3:22

Personnel 

 Joe Cocker – lead vocals
 Jeff Levine – keyboards (1-3, 5, 6, 8, 9), Hammond organ (4), grand piano (10)
 Robbie Kilgore – additional keyboards (3, 5, 6, 9), handclaps (4)
 Greg Johnson – grand piano (8), organ (10)
 Phil Grande – guitars, guitar solo (6, 10)
 T. M. Stevens – bass
 David Beal – drums
 Sammy Figueroa – percussion (3, 5-8)
 Glenn Ellison – handclaps (4)
 Charlie Midnight – handclaps (4)
 Clarence Clemons – tenor sax solo (1)
 The Uptown Horns – horns and horn arrangements (1)
 Crispin Cioe – saxophones
 Arno Hecht – saxophones
 Robert Funk – trombone
 "Hollywood" Paul Litteral – trumpet
 Lawrence Feldman – saxophone (3)
 Ric Cunningham – alto saxophone (7)
 Tawatha Agee – backing vocals (1-4, 6, 7, 9, 10)
 Benny Diggs – backing vocals (1-4, 6, 7, 9)
 Vaneese Thomas – backing vocals (1-4, 6, 7, 9)
 Dan Hartman – backing vocals (2, 4, 6, 7, 10), additional percussion (3), tambourine (4), handclaps (4), additional guitars (5, 6, 8, 10), keyboards (7), guitars (7)
 B.J. Nelson – backing vocals (2, 4, 6, 10)
 Renée Geyer – guest vocals (8)
 Phoebe Snow – guest vocals (9)
 Maxine Green – backing vocals (10)
 Jayne Ann Lang – backing vocals (10)
 Janice Singleton – backing vocals (10)

Production 

 Producer – Charlie Midnight
 Executive Producer – Dan Hartman
 Engineer – John Rollo
 Additional Engineer – Joel Soyffer
 Assistant Engineers – Nelson Ayers, Thom Chadley, Mark Gaide, Danny Grigsby, Paul Higgins and Dave Mendenhall.
 Recorded at House of Music (West Orange, NJ); Santa Barbara Sound Design (Santa Barbara, CA); O’Henry Sound Studios (Burbank, CA); Greene Street Recording (New York, NY); Bearsville Studios (Bearsville, NY).
 Mixed by Chris Lord-Alge at Unique Recording Studios (New York, NY).
 Mix Assistants – Steve Entebbe and Matt Hathaway
 Mastered by Bob Ludwig at Masterdisk (New York, NY).
 Art Direction – Roy Kohara
 Design – Roland Young
 Photography – Abe Frajndilich
 Management – Michael Lang

Charts

Certifications

Accolades

References

1987 albums
Joe Cocker albums
Albums produced by Dan Hartman
Capitol Records albums